Park Han-sol is a South Korean actress. She is known for her roles in dramas such as Hospital Playlist, Soul Mechanic and Please Don't Date Him.

Filmography

Television series

Film

References

External links

 
 

1995 births
Living people
21st-century South Korean actresses
South Korean female models
South Korean television actresses
South Korean film actresses